Statistics of Second Division Football Tournament in the Maldives in the 2018 season.

Group stage
From each group, the top two teams will be advanced for the Semi-finals.

All times listed are Maldives Standard Time.

Group 1

Group 2

Semi-finals

Final

Awards

Final ranking

Per statistical convention in football, matches decided in extra time are counted as wins and losses, while matches decided by penalty shoot-out are counted as draws.

References

External links
 ބަދަލާ އެކު ދެ ވަނަ ޑިވިޝަނުގެ ވާދަވެރިކަން ބޮޑުވާނެ! at Miharu Sports (Dhivehi)
 ނިއުގެ މިދުހަތު ޖޭޖޭ އަށް ބަދަލުވެއްޖެ at Miharu Sports (Dhivehi)
 Second Division Championship at Sun Sports (Dhivehi)

Maldivian Second Division Football Tournament seasons
Maldives
Maldives
2